Ethan Tucker is rosh yeshiva (rabbinic dean) and co-founder of Yeshivat Hadar in Manhattan.

Early life and education 

Tucker is the son of Rabbi Gordon Tucker and Hadassah Lieberman, and the stepson of former U.S. Senator Joe Lieberman.

Career 
Tucker is considered an authority on Egalitarianism in Jewish law. He is the co-author, with Rabbi Micha'el Rosenberg, of Gender Equality and Prayer in Jewish Law (2016). Tucker is also the co-host, with Hadar colleague Rabbi Avi Killip, of the podcast, Responsa Radio, produced by Jewish Public Media.

See also 
 Shai Held
 Elie Kaunfer

References

External links 

 What is a Jew? - an Eli Talk by Rabbi Tucker
 Ethan Tucker's Blog at the Times of Israel

Living people
American Conservative rabbis
20th-century American rabbis
21st-century American rabbis
Year of birth missing (living people)
Jewish Theological Seminary of America alumni
Harvard College alumni
Conservative rosh yeshivas